Cyril Dessel (born 29 November 1974 in Rive-de-Gier, Loire) is a French former professional road racing cyclist, who competed as a professional from 2000 to 2011.

In 2006, he won the Tour Méditerranéen on the UCI Europe Tour. Then in the 2006 Tour de France, he finished second in the tenth stage, taking the leader's yellow jersey for a day and the lead in the King of the Mountains competition; he eventually finished sixth. In 2008, he won the 16th stage of the Tour after being in a chase group most of the day, beating David Arroyo, Yaroslav Popovych and Sandy Casar.

Dessel competed for France at the 2008 Summer Olympics.

Career achievements

Major results

2002
 3rd Grand Prix d'Ouverture
2003
 9th Overall Critérium du Dauphiné Libéré
2004
 2nd Road race, National Road Championships
 8th Overall Ronde van Nederland
2006
 6th Overall Tour de France
Held  after Stage 10
Held  after Stage 10
2nd Stage 10
 1st Overall, Tour Méditerranéen
1st Stage 4
 1st Overall Tour de l'Ain
1st Stage 1
1st Points classification
2008
 1st Stage 3 Volta a Catalunya
 1st Stage 16 Tour de France
 6th Overall Critérium du Dauphiné Libéré
1st Stage 4
 9th Overall Four Days of Dunkirk
1st Stage 5

Grand Tour general classification results timeline

DNF=Did not finish

References

External links

 Dessel's home page on the AG2R Prévoyance website 
 
 
 
 
 
 
 

1974 births
Living people
People from Rive-de-Gier
French male cyclists
French Tour de France stage winners
Cyclists at the 2008 Summer Olympics
Olympic cyclists of France
Sportspeople from Loire (department)
Cyclists from Auvergne-Rhône-Alpes